The Tête de l'Estrop is a mountain of the  French Prealps located in Alpes-de-Haute-Provence, France. It is the highest peak of the Provence Alps and Prealps.

Geography 
Administratively the mountain is divided between the French communes of Prads-Haute-Bléone (southern slopes) and Méolans-Revel (vallon du Laverq, northern slopes).

Access to the summit 
The easiest route to the summit starts from La Foux d'Allos, a ski resort in the commune of Allos, which reaches the top through the eastern slopes of the mountain.

Other facts 
 It has the scenic peculiarity of being currently the furthest mountain in the world portrayed in front of a sunrise (a worldwide record of sunrise picture).
On 24 March 2015, Germanwings Flight 9525 crashed into the lower western slopes of the mountain.

References

Maps 
 French  official cartography (Institut géographique national - IGN); on-line version:  www.geoportail.fr

Bibliography 
 Caracal et les Sancho Panza, Male Vesse, récit et 12 descentes de canyons dans le pays dignois, 2006

Two-thousanders of France
Mountains of the Alps
Mountains of Alpes-de-Haute-Provence